Wiswillani (Hispanicized spellings Huishuillane, Huishuillani, erroneously also Huishillani) or Q'asa (Quechua for mountain pass, Hispanicized spelling Ccasa) is a mountain in the Andes of Peru, about  high. It is situated in the Arequipa Region, Caylloma Province, on the border of the districts Tisco and Callalli. The mountain lies south of the lake Samaquta.

By the local people Wiswillani is venerated as an apu.

References 

Mountains of Peru
Mountains of Arequipa Region